Taeniolabidoidea is a group of extinct mammals known from North America and Asia. They were the largest members of the extinct order Multituberculata, as well as the largest non-therian mammals. Lambdopsalis even provides direct fossil evidence of mammalian fur in a fairly good state of preservation for a 60-million-year-old animal. Some of these animals were large for their time; Taeniolabis taoensis is the largest known multituberculate and though smaller, Yubaatar is the largest known Mesozoic Asian multituberculate. Average members of the Taeniolaboidea were about beaver-sized and the largest even reached sizes comparable to the largest beavers like Castoroides, up to about 100 kilograms.

The group was initially established as a suborder, before being assigned the rank of a superfamily by McKenna and Bell in 1997 (see Kielan-Jaworowska and Hurum (2001) p. 391-392). Two families are recognised: the primarily North American Taeniolabididae, composed of Taeniolabis and Kimbetopsalis, and the exclusively Asian Lambdopsalidae, composed of Lambdopsalis, Sphenopsalis and Prionessus, with Valenopsalis being a basal form outside of either clade. Some of the fossils are well-preserved. Though the possible taeniolabidoid Bubodens is known from the Lancian Late Cretaceous deposits of South Dakota, and Yubaatar is known from Late Cretaceous deposits in the Henan Province, the clade is otherwise only clearly represented in Paleocene strata.

Derived characteristics of the taxon (apomorphies) include: "snout short and wide with anterior part of zygomatic arches directed transversely, resulting in a square-like shape of the skull (shared with Kogaionidae); frontals small, pointed posteriorly, almost or completely excluded from the orbital rim," (Kielan-Jaworowska and Hurum 2001, p. 417).

References 

 Kielan-Jaworowska Z. and Hurum J.H., "Phylogeny and Systematics of multituberculate mammals". Paleontology 44, p. 389-429, 2001.
 McKenna M.C. and Bell S.K., (1997), Classification of Mammals Above the Species Level. Columbia University Press, 1997.
 Much of this information has been derived from  MESOZOIC MAMMALS: Eucosmodontidae, Microcosmodontidae and Taeniolabidoidea, an Internet directory.

Multituberculates
Paleocene extinctions
Late Cretaceous first appearances